SimpleScreenRecorder is a Qt-based screencast software made for Unix operating systems, which handles similar tasks FFmpeg/avconv and VLC does.

Features
SimpleScreenRecorder can capture a video-audio record of the entire computer screen or part of it, or record OpenGL applications such as video games directly. The program synchronizes the captured video and audio, reduces the frame rate of the video if the user's computer is too slow, and is fully multi-threaded. Users can pause and resume recording by clicking a button or by pressing a hotkey. The program can also show statistics about the computer's performance during recording. The program allows users to select options for the screen capture such as 'Follow the cursor' and 'Record the cursor'. SimpleScreenRecorder can output video and audio into many final file container formats. These distinct video and audio encodings are also customizable. The resolution and frame rate of the resulting video may be set prior to recording, as may the audio quality of the video.

See also
Comparison of screencasting software
Screencast

References

External links
Recording desktop or gaming audio
Recording Steam games 
Project website on Github

Linux software
Screencasting software
Video software that uses Qt